Mabel O. Wilson (born 1963) is an American architect, designer, and scholar. She is the founder of Studio& and a professor at the Columbia University Graduate School of Architecture, Planning, and Preservation.

Education
Wilson received a Bachelor of Science in Architecture at the University of Virginia in 1985, a Master's of Architecture at Columbia University in 1991, and a Ph.D. in American Studies from New York University in 2007.

Career
Wilson is the co-founder of Studio &, an architecture firm exploring different facets of art, architecture, and cultural history. Her research and writing explore race in contemporary art, film, and new media; the social production of space; and politics and cultural memory in Black America.

Wilson is the Nancy and George Rupp Professor at the Columbia University Graduate School of Architecture, Planning and Preservation and is also a professor in the African American and African Diasporic Studies Department. She serves as the director of the Institute for Research in African American Studies and co-directs Global Africa Lab.

She has taught courses in architectural design, history, and theory since 2007. Also at Columbia, she is the Director of the Institute for Research in African American Studies (IRAAS) and, alongside Mario Gooden, is the co-director of Global Africa Lab (GAL). Wilson is a founding member of Who Builds Your Architecture? (WBYA?)—a project that examines "the links between labor, architecture and the global networks that form around building buildings."

In 2021, Wilson co-organized the 'Reconstructions: Architecture and Blackness in America' exhibition at The Museum of Modern Art in New York. It is the first exhibition at MoMA to feature a collective body of work by 10 African-American architects, artists and designers  trying to “reclaim the larger civic promise of architecture,” as stated by the New York Times.

Books
Wilson has written a number of books, including Race and Modern Architecture: A Critical History from the Enlightenment to the Present (Co-Editor with Irene Cheng and Charles L. Davis II), forthcoming from University of Pittsburgh Press, 2020, Begin with the Past: Building the National Museum of African American History and Culture, Smithsonian Institution, 2016, and Negro Building: Black Americans in the World of Fairs and Museums, University of California Press, 2012.

Awards and honors
2021: Society of Architectural Historians (SAH) Class of Fellows
2019: American Academy of Arts and Letters Award in Architecture
2019: Educator/Mentor honor from Architectural Record's Women in Architecture Design Leadership Program
2015–16: Ailsa Mellon Bruce Senior Fellow at the National Gallery of Art's Center for Advanced Study in Visual Arts (CASVA)
2011: United States Artists Ford Fellow in Architecture and Design

References

External links
 Columbia University GSAPP,  Professor of Architecture, Planning and Preservation and Professor in African American and African Diasporic Studies, and the Director of the Institute for Research in African American Studies
 

1963 births
Living people
American designers
American women architects
Columbia Graduate School of Architecture, Planning and Preservation alumni
New York University alumni
University of Virginia School of Architecture alumni
Columbia Graduate School of Architecture, Planning and Preservation faculty
21st-century American women